Woolner is an upper middle class suburb of Darwin, Northern Territory, Australia.

History

Woolner was named after the Woolner (Wulna, Djeramanga) Aboriginal tribal group which occupied the area east of Darwin when the town was founded in 1869.

References

External links
Darwin map
Woolner: Suburb Profile

Suburbs of Darwin, Northern Territory
History of the Northern Territory